Melinda Anamaria Geiger (born 28 March 1987) is a Romanian handball player who is playing for  CS Gloria 2018 Bistrița-Năsăud and the Romanian national team.

Geiger announced her retirement in February 2019 at the age of 31 citing recurring knee problems but came back from retirement in 2022 and joined CS Gloria 2018 Bistrița-Năsăud.

Achievements
German Championship:
Winner: 2012
Romanian Championship:
Winner: 2011, 2014
Silver Medalist: 2013, 2015, 2016
French Championship:
Silver Medalist: 2017
Romanian Cup:
Winner: 2011, 2013, 2014, 2015
Romanian Supercup:
Winner: 2011, 2013
IHF World Championship:
Bronze Medalist: 2015
European Championship:
Bronze Medalist: 2010
GF World Cup:
Gold Medalist: 2010
Silver Medalist: 2006

Personal life
She is the daughter of Margareta and Mihály Geiger, former sportsman. Although Melinda is of Hungarian descent through her father, she does not speak Hungarian at all. She graduated in foreign languages (German-English). Geiger has a brother and sister.

References

External links

 

1987 births
Living people
Sportspeople from Baia Mare
Romanian female handball players
Expatriate handball players
Romanian expatriate sportspeople in France
Romanian expatriate sportspeople in Germany
Romanian expatriate sportspeople in Hungary
SCM Râmnicu Vâlcea (handball) players
CS Minaur Baia Mare (women's handball) players
Siófok KC players
Handball players at the 2016 Summer Olympics
Olympic handball players of Romania
Romanian sportspeople of Hungarian descent